Sianne Ngai is an American cultural theorist, literary critic, and feminist scholar.  From 2000 to 2007 she was an Assistant Professor of English at Stanford University, from 2007-2011 an Associate Professor of English at UCLA, and from 2011 to 2017 Professor of English at Stanford University. She joined the faculty of the University of Chicago in fall 2017. Ngai earned her B.A. from Brown University in 1993 and her Ph.D from Harvard in 2000.

Ngai has published the books Our Aesthetic Categories: Zany, Cute, Interesting (2012), and Ugly Feelings (2005), both released by Harvard University Press. Sections of both books have been translated into Swedish, Italian, German, Slovenian, Portuguese, Japanese, and Korean. Her most recent manuscript is called Theory of the Gimmick.

Critical theory

Ngai studies the emotional gaps, contradictions, and negativities in literature, film, and theoretical writing in order to explore situations of suspended agency. She is also interested in the aesthetic judgements people make under capitalism.

Publications

Ugly Feelings (2005)

In her book Ugly Feelings, Sianne Ngai constructs a theoretical framework for analyzing and mobilizing affective concepts and presents a series of studies in the aesthetics of negative emotions, examining their politically ambiguous work in a range of cultural artifacts produced in what Theodor W. Adorno and Max Horkheimer refer to in their text, Dialectic of Enlightenment, as the ‘fully administered world of late modernity' 
 
Envy, irritation, paranoia—in contrast to powerful and dynamic negative emotions like anger, these non-cathartic states of feeling are associated with situations in which action is blocked or suspended. In her examination of the cultural forms to which these affects give rise, Sianne Ngai suggests that these minor and more politically ambiguous feelings become all the more suited for diagnosing the character of late modernity.

Each of the feelings explored in the book – envy, anxiety, paranoia, irritation - and Ngai’s two new categories of negative affect – "animatedness" and "stuplimity" mobilizes the aesthetics of ugly feelings to investigate not only ideological and representational dilemmas in literature — with a particular focus on those inflected by gender and race — but also blind spots in contemporary literary and cultural criticism.
  
Animatedness is Ngai's term for the politically charged affect of non-mainstream groups who are characterized as overly emotional, overly agitated, and usually overly sexed while simultaneously imagined as pliant, or lacking in individual agency. Think here of contradictory stereotypical representations: the raucous festivals of Cinco de Mayo and the recent immigration protests produced by "lazy Mexicans"; or the putative hypersexuality of African American "welfare mothers" endlessly "breeding" but failing to take the initiative to support their offspring, or snag their mates into doing so; or the cunning, hand-wringing Jew who is "revealed" as a puppet of the ruling class.  Animatedness is a matter of proportion: a combination of too much affect and too little agency.

Stuplimity, Ngai's other theoretical construct, looks at the failure of classical theories of the sublime to account for a new phenomenon of boredom combined with awe.  Stupefaction meets sublimity in Ngai's stuplimity - a theoretical construction that might, in a more vernacular voice, be called "the whatever factor." Numbness and hyperattentive-ness, boredom and awe, nonchalance and monotony in the face of the overwhelming are the features of stuplimity. One can hardly imagine a more crucial topic for social theory (and praxis) than finding a way to crack the "whatever" factor and mobilize citizens to act in their own interests rather than turning away from the catastrophes that their own passivities, coupled with rapaciousness are heaping upon the world.

Our Aesthetic Categories (2012)

In her book Our Aesthetic Categories, Ngai argues that the Zany, Cute and the Interesting, for all their marginality to aesthetic theory and to genealogies of postmodernism, are the ones in our current repertoire best suited to grasping how aesthetic experience has been transformed by the hypercommodified, information-saturated, performance-driven conditions of late capitalism 
Ngai considers how those feelings help us form judgments about the aesthetic world:  How do we know to describe something as “interesting” or “zany”, and most importantly, what does our critical vocabulary say about our present time?
 
"Cute" is a much more ambivalent description than social niceties will allow us to admit. When we snatch up something cute in an embrace, we pantomime the act of defending a defenseless little pal from an imaginary threat, but the rigid urgency of our embrace, and the concomitant 'devouring-in-kisses' suggests that what we're protecting the cute thing from is ourselves.
Using the example of a frog-shaped baby's bath toy, Ngai illustrates that cuteness is an aestheticization of powerlessness, as the purpose of the cute bath toy is for it to be pressed against a baby's body, and squished in a way guaranteed to repeatedly crush and deform its formless face. The nonaesthetic properties associated with cuteness - smallness, compactness, formal simplicity, softness or pliancy thus also index minor negative affects such as helplessness, pitifulness and even despondency.  Ngai also argues that the term cuteness is a way of sexualizing beings while simultaneously rendering them unthreatening.  She illustrates this by providing several examples of poems that deploy ‘cuteness’ as a means of rendering the overtly aggressive and sexual dimension of the theme unthreatening.

If "cuteness" is symptomatic of the aesthetics of contemporary consumption, zaniness is about production. Perhaps the classic cinematic example would be Charlie Chaplin's character in Modern Times, who struggles energetically to submit to the inhuman demands of the factory in which he works. Unable to keep up with the staccato demands of the production line, Chaplin is dragged by the conveyor belt into the heart of the machine itself. Chaplin becomes the archetypal modern zany; a jittery bundle of crankshaft limbs, whose stiff gestures make every vibration of the projector visible upon the screen.
 
Unlike the blobby cute or the hyperactive zany, the aesthetic form of interesting has no external characteristics, it is a space of judgment. We recognize it through context, that is, through novelty, through the emergence of an unexpected element within a predictable sequence.

Our Aesthetic Categories was listed in The Chronicle of Higher Education as one of the 11 best scholarly books of the 2010s, chosen by Merve Emre.

Theory of the Gimmick (2020)
Her newest book, Theory of the Gimmick explores the "gimmick" as encoding a relation to labor (the gimmicky artwork irritates us because it seems to be working too hard to get our attention, but also not working hard enough), and as the inverted image of the modernist "device" celebrated by Victor Shklovsky. While both are essentially artistic techniques that perform the reflexive action of "laying bare" the means by which their effects are produced, in one case this action gives rise to a negative aesthetic judgment while it becomes a bearer of high aesthetic value in the other
Extending the focus in Ngai's second book on the historical significance of the rise of equivocal aesthetic categories (such as the merely 'interesting') and with an eye to the special difficulties posed by the very idea of an aesthetics of production (as opposed to reception), Theory of the Gimmick explores the uneasy mix of attraction and repulsion produced by the gimmick across a range of forms specific to western capitalism. These include fictions by Mark Twain, Charles Chesnutt, Gertrude Stein, Joris-Karl Huysmans, Villiers de L'Isle-Adam, and Henry James; twentieth-century poetic stunts; the video installations of contemporary artist Stan Douglas; reality television; and the novel of ideas.

Selected articles
“Stuplimity: Shock and Boredom in Twentieth-Century Aesthetics,” Postmodern Culture, Muse, 2000
“Bad Timing (A Sequel), Paranoia, Feminism, and Poetry," Duke University Press, 2001
“Jealous Schoolgirls, Single White Females, and Other Bad Examples: Rethinking Gender and Envy,” Camera Obscura, Duke University Press, 2001
"Moody Subjects/Projectile Objects: Anxiety and Intellectual Displacement in Hitchcock, Heidegger, and Melville," Qui Parle, University of Nebraska Press, 2001
“A Foul Lump Started Making Promises in My Voice”: Race, Affect, and the Animated Subject,” American Literature, Duke University Press, 2002
“The Cuteness of the Avant-Garde,” Critical Inquiry, The University of Chicago Press, 2005
“Competitiveness: from ‘Sula to Tyra,’” The Feminist Press at the City University of New York, 2006
“Merely Interesting,” Critical Inquiry, The University of Chicago Press, 2008
“Visceral Abstractions,” GLQ: A Journal of Lesbian and Gay Studies, Duke University Press, 2016

Awards
Ngai has been a recipient of a 2007-08 Charles A. Rysamp Fellowship from the American Council of Learned Societies.  She was a Fellow at the Institute of Advanced Studies in Berlin, Germany in 2014-15.  Ngai has also served as visiting faculty at the Cornell School for Criticism and Theory in the summer of 2014.  She was awarded an honorary Doctorate of Philosophy in Humanities from the University of Copenhagen in Copenhagen, Denmark in 2015.
Her book Our Aesthetic Categories: Zany, Cute, Interesting was the winner of the MLA James Russell Lowell Prize and the PCA/ACA Ray and Pat Browne award.

References

American philosophers
Year of birth missing (living people)
Living people
Harvard University alumni
Brown University alumni